Raymond's tomb is the tomb of Michel Joachim Marie Raymond, a French general in the army of 2nd Nizam - Nizam Ali Khan, Asaf Jah II. The tomb, located in Hyderabad, India is a black granite tombstone, conical, about 7 metres high and it has the initials JR on it. The pavilion was built by the Nizam and collapsed in October 2001 in heavy rain.

History
The 200-year-old tomb had a facelift, including a brand new pavilion. Opened 14 April 2003 this cost an estimated 500,000 INR.

Location
The tomb is located near Asman Garh Palace on top of a hillock at Tirumala Hills, Malakpet, about 3 km from the Oliphant Bridge (currently known as Chaderghat Bridge), in East Hyderabad. Until about 1940, people would visit his tomb on the anniversary of his death, taking incense and other offerings to him. The Nizams would send to his tomb on 25 March every year, a box of cheroots and a bottle of beer. His grave had become like a shrine. He is also remembered in Hyderabad, with the area called Mussa Ram Bagh (Monsieur Raymond). This Obelisk also offers a beautiful view of the Old city of Hyderabad.

References

Hyderabad State
Monuments and memorials in Hyderabad, India
Mausoleums in Telangana